Cennet and Cehennem are the names of two large sinkholes in the Taurus Mountains, in Mersin Province, Turkey. The sinkholes are among the tourist attractions of the province.

Geography 

Cennet and Cehennem are situated next to each other. Both of them are in the rural area of the Silifke district which in turn is a part of Mersin Province. They are close to the coastal town of Narlıkuyu.

Cennet 

It is possible to reach the bottom of Cennet by a primitive staircase composed of 300 steps. In 2020 also an elevator was established. At the bottom toward the south, there is a smaller and 150 step deeper cave. In this cave are the ruins of a monastery built in the 5th century by a certain Paulus and dedicated to Virgin Mary. In this monastery one can hear the sound of a small underground stream which flows from the monastery to the gulf of Narlıkuyu.

Cehennem 

But its top opening is smaller with dimensions 70 x 50 m2 ( 210 x 150 ft2 ). As the upper edge of the opening is concave there is no access to the bottom of Cehennem.

Mythology
In mythology, Zeus kept Typhon temporarily in Cehennem before imprisoning him under Mount Etna.(see Corycian Cave)

See also 
 List of sinkholes of Turkey

References 

Archaeological sites in Mersin Province, Turkey
Geography of Mersin Province
Landforms of Mersin Province
Sinkholes of Turkey
Olba territorium